The badminton women's doubles tournament at the 1986 Asian Games in Olympic Gymnastics Arena, Seoul, South Korea took place from 1 October to 4 October.

15 teams from 9 nations entered for the tournament and the Chinese duo of Lin Ying and Guan Weizhen won the gold in this tournament. with a three-set victory over Korea's Kim Yun-ja and Yoo Sang-hee. Japan and Indonesia shared the bronze medal after losing in the semifinal.

Schedule
All times are Korea Standard Time (UTC+09:00)

Results

References
 1st round results
 Quarterfinals results
 Semifinals results
 Final results

External links
Badminton Asia

Women's doubles